Ultimate Knight Windom XP (Ultimate Knight ウィンダムXP [Ultimate Knight UindamuXP]) or UKWXP, is a Japanese Indie game originally developed by Y. Kamada for the PC as a sequel to his previous work, the Bootfighter Windom XP SP-2. It features an assortment of 3D mechas which the player can control and use to fight battles, either online or versus bot opponents. The game is inspired by Japanese Mecha based on anime and video games with game-play resembling mech versus games on older consoles but with enhanced options such as the 60 FPS screen refresh rate, including online game-play capabilities.

History
On December 29, 2008, Y. Kamada released the first version, entitled "Ultimate Knight Windom XP". This version was released in both English and Japanese. Various patches were released, encompassing version numbers ver.1.000 through ver.1.009.

On January 6, 2009, Curious Factory released a trial version in English and on February 7, the game was on the market. An expansion of the game called "Ultimate Knight Windom XP - PowerUp Kit", was released in Japan on December 17. In that version, the original game engine was modified to include more scripting commands and in-game features, and added compatibility with the newer operation systems. The expansion received four patches up to ver.2.004. The Project Windom planned to release another retail expansion, but they decided to release as a free patch, numbered as ver.2.005. This patch was the first which resolved the PowerUp Kit's delay in handling functions, make the online mode more welcoming by resolving the slow network latency problem that was present in older versions, and resolved the issue of random slowdown for singleplayer game-modes. Additional patches was released later on, leaving the game's final version at ver.2.008. The author had released both English and Japanese versions only for versions 1.007 - 1.009 patches.

Y. Kamada later went on "Ultimate Knight Windom SV Lite", which succeeds the PowerUp Kit version with a redesigned game engine. Unlike the PowerUp Kit, SV Lite was never translated and is only available within Japan.

In November 10., 2016 the website of Project Windom was closed, officially announcing the end of the Windom game series. Ultimate Knight Windom XP and its expansion pack (PowerUp Kit) still available for digital download on some Japanese websites.

Game details

On its initial release, the game had seventeen different mecha for use. In v2.000, five more were added. With v2.005, another two were added, bringing the total count to twenty-four. The mechas are named after operating systems for computers (such as Windom or Linux), sometimes with slight variations, or using the codename of the operating system's development version (such as Vienna, Blackcomb). The game follows an unlocking system, where finishing "Arcade Mode" in any level of difficulty with a specific mecha enables the player to unlock a new one for customisation and use in all other modes.

There are a total of eight game-play modes: Arcade, Survival, Practice, Team Battle, Blitz Tactics, Hangar, Local Battle, and Online Battle.

The Local Battle mode allows the players to play on the same computer in split-screen. This requires at least one controller connected to the PC, and can be played with maximum four players. This game mode is similar to the Online Battle mode, but it supports only four character at the same time (players and AI bots together). The Local Battle is the only one mode which not let the players to use items or colours.

The Online Battle mode can be played through internet or LAN connection. A lobby will show up when the mode is selected, which requires the input of an IP address or a domain to be able to connect and play. In this mode, the game can be played up to 10 people at the same time and empty slots can be filled with AI bots. The game comes with a simple server creation program to allow anyone to set up small servers on their computer. On one address, a maximum of five servers can be running at the same time. Then the servers become selectable on the room option after the connection. It has a built in in-game chat function, and various option to costumise the gameplay (e.g.: enable the use of the items). The Online Battle mode allows only one player from every connected computers, and can not be played in split-screen.

Hangar mode allows players to customise their unlocked mechas through items that can be collected in Arcade mode. A wide variety of actions such as changing colour schemes and equipping items that boost statistics for use in any other modes. While colours can be found in all levels of difficulty, not all items can be found in all levels of difficulty.

The items themselves are allocated in five "classes" namely: S, A, B, C, D, by descending order of rarity. There are items that add more damage, while others increase the defence (can be called armor), increase the maximum energy and boost supply, or make it faster recharge. A few of them are named after such mythological artifacts as "Aegis", "Draupnir", and "Hringhorni". These are unique items which increase more than one type of stats, for example it can increase the attack power and defence at the same time. It can be get only by playing hard mode, but still much more rarer compared to other S class items.

The game allows custom pilots made by players using mini audio clip and images. Audio clips are categorised and played at random depending on the situation that the player is currently in. These pilots can be used in single- or multiplayer mode. During multiplayer game-play, custom pilots from other players will be visible and audible. However, these pilots will not be downloaded and they are only available for the players that has its file contents. After the release of the PowerUp Kit expansion, the game comes with a pilot maker program to aid players in making their own animated pilots.

You can also add your own music to the game by putting it in the MyBGM folder. These tracks will not be played automatically, but they can be selected as BGM in any game-modes that allows music selection. During online play the BGMs are only applicable to the player just like the custom pilots.

As multiplayer, the game works with standard direct connection method. One of the players create and run a server, while all of the other players are connect with the host's IP address, or with the address of the DNS server. The game also has an option to play on Arcade Mode in 2 player cooperative mode from the same computer (local split-screen multiplayer).

Game-play
The game is played in a dynamic 3D third-person Shooter view featuring the control of robots or mechas. It is similar to the Virtual-On series extended engine. All of your movements and attacks are dependent to the opponent that you have locked on to. The mechas typically have a long-range primary weapon and a melee secondary attack. It is possible to guard or for some mechas, the ability to reflect beam attacks. Mechas are able to fly about using their thrusters, which are limited by the amount of boost gauge that they have. Each mecha has three other sub attacks that could be used in conjunction with their main weapons. Some mechs has the ability to combine the melee attack with one of the subweapons to perform special combos. These combos usually inescapable for the opponent. With the exception of the melee (or the attack in the place of the melee) all of the attacks require time to recharge, and become usable again.

A bar on the lower right corner (EX gauge) will be charged when you receive damage or successfully execute an attack. The attack can either be charged up to the largest amount of EX available or just a level, up to the maximum of five, depending on the player; after which, the player can use it to raise the damage caused by an attack, increase the number of the launched projectiles, or make the attack last longer on screen (more hit from the same attack). The charged attacks can be launched even the weapon isn't recharged yet, but this make the weapon's recharge gauge deplete even more (more time required to recharge normally). Other uses for the EX gauge includes but not limited to evasion, recovering from an attack, or cancelling attacks to extend a combo during melee. A special ability called OverClocking was introduced in version 2.005. The mecha gets increased weapon and booster gauge recovery, attacks get recharged much quicker, and the costs of the EX using moves will be reduced by using up the rest of the EX gauge. However, the ability can only be activated when there are at least four levels of EX available. In version 2.008, this was changed to at least three levels of EX instead of four in order to activate OverClocking. The ability ends when the EX gauge is empty, bringing the mecha back to normal. If the mech is destroyed during the activation, it lose all of the EX after respawn.

The game's characters (mechs) are comes in a wide variety range. Some of them are more effective from closer range, counterwise the others are better from long range. The HP, the energy and the boost capacity, as well the respawn count and the moving speed changes from mechs to machs. These stats mostly correspond to the style of the character, and it is the main "advantage" to utilize. These stats can be altered by equipping items in the Hangar. The values displayed at the selected item is mean the percentage of the original stat that will be added. A maximum of four items can be equipped on every mech at once. One item can be equipped on multiple mechs, but can't be equipped more times on a single mech.

References

External links

 Official website, archived
 Official Ultimate Knight Windom XP English website, archived

Indie video games
Multiplayer and single-player video games